Summer Lake is an unincorporated community in northwest Lake County, Oregon, United States. It is on Oregon Route 31 approximately halfway between Bend and Lakeview. It is at the base of the eastern slope of Winter Ridge adjacent to the Fremont–Winema National Forests.

History 

It was named by Captain John C. Frémont during his 1843 mapping expedition through Central Oregon.

Frémont and his Army Topographical team were mapping the Oregon Country as they traveled from The Dalles on Columbia River to Sutter's Fort in Sacramento, California. On December 16, 1843, the expedition struggled down a steep cliff from a snow-covered plateau to reach a lake in the valley below. Frémont named them "Winter Ridge" and "Summer Lake." From the rocky cliff overlooking the lake basin, Frémont described the discovery and naming of Summer Lake as follows:

(Captain John C. Frémont, December 16, 1843, Report of the Second Frémont Expedition)

The first settlers began to arrive in the Summer Lake Valley around 1870. However, the high desert was difficult to farm, and many early settlers stayed only a few years before moving on to greener country.  As a result, the population of the valley never grew beyond a few hundred people.

Climate
Summer Lake has a borderline Mediterranean (Köppen Csb)/continental Mediterranean (Dsb) climate, quite typical for upland Oregon and characterised by cold winters and summers with chilly mornings and hot afternoons.

Spring typically warms up rapidly, although cold nights are normal into June: the last freezing minimum can be expected around May 27 and the first fall freeze around September 21. During the summer, afternoons are typically hot: an average summer will see 42.6 afternoons reach  and 2.7 exceed . Rainfall is not common during the summer, although July 1987 saw  fall, of which  fell in two days from a huge storm which saw maxima fall as low as  after having been  two afternoons previously.

Economy

Facilities in Summer Lake include a post office, gas station, store, motel, restaurants, and several bed and breakfast establishments.  An art and science residency program, Playa, is located 12.4 miles south on Oregon Highway 31.

Parks and recreation
There is a wayside park located across the highway from the post office and store that has six interpretive markers highlighting the Frémont Expedition's travel through the Summer Lake basin, the geology of the Summer Lake region, and Oregon's Outback Scenic Byway.

Museums and sites of interest 

Summer Lake is home to the well-preserved nineteenth-century Harris School, a one-room schoolhouse built in 1890 by the Harris family, who were among the first pioneer families to settle in the Summer Lake area. The school closed in 1919, and then briefly reopened in 1926 for three more years.

Wildlife refuge 
The Summer Lake Basin supports more than 250 species of birds including bald eagles, Canada geese, white faced ibis, yellow-headed blackbirds, goshawks, hermit thrushes, red-tail hawks, great blue herons, and numerous species of ducks. This makes Summer Lake a favorite bird watching and hunting area.

The Oregon Department of Fish and Wildlife maintains the Summer Lake Wildlife Area on the north side of the lake. The refuge consists of a large wetland marsh fed by the Ana River and associated high desert uplands with an  tour route open to the public most of the year.

The refuge headquarters and several housing units are located adjacent to Oregon Route 31 at the south end of the town. The Department of Fish and Wildlife operation and the visitors who come to the refuge are an important part of the Summer Lake economy.

References 

Unincorporated communities in Lake County, Oregon
Unincorporated communities in Oregon